The Peacekeeper Rail Garrison was a railcar-launched ICBM that was developed by the United States Air Force during the 1980s as part of a plan to place fifty MGM-118A Peacekeeper intercontinental ballistic missiles on the rail network of the United States. The railcars were intended, in case of increased threat of nuclear war, to be deployed onto the nation's rail network to avoid being destroyed by a first strike counterforce attack by the Soviet Union. However, the plan was canceled as part of defense cutbacks following the end of the Cold War, and the Peacekeeper missiles were installed in silo launchers as LGM-118s instead.

Development

On December 19, 1986, the White House announced that U.S. President Ronald Reagan had given approval to a plan for the development of a railroad-based system for basing part of the planned LGM-118 Peacekeeper – originally referred to as MX for "Missile, Experimental" – intercontinental ballistic missile (ICBM) force. Intended to increase the survivability of the force in the event of a counterforce nuclear attack by the Soviet Union, the 50 train-based missile launchers, fitted two to each of twenty-five trains, would supplement a force of 50 silo-based missiles that would replace existing Minuteman missiles.

Each train was planned to consist of two locomotives (appeared to be EMD GP40-2 in unclassified diagrams), two cars for housing security forces (using a modified box car), two launchers each holding a single missile (using a modified box car), a launch control car (using a modified Westinghouse box car), a fuel car, and a maintenance car (using a modified box car). Each launching car would carry one missile in a tube that, upon the receipt of an authenticated firing command, would elevate to fire the missile from the bed of the car. A crew of 42 people—including the train commander, four launch control officers, four railroad engineers, one medic, six maintenance personnel, and 26 security police—could live in the launch control and security cars for up to one month.

Following testing in 1989 at Hudson, CO, two ex-CSX locomotives, an EMD GP40-2 and an EMD GP38-2, were sent to Precision National in Mount Vernon, IL for modification to GP40-2DE (Dynamic braking, Extended range) with bulletproof glass in the cab windows. The trains were expected to be in service within about two years. Strategic Air Command wanted the first trains stationed at F. E. Warren Air Force Base near the Union Pacific mainline at Cheyenne, WY. The expected in-service date was December 1992. Rail Garrisons would resemble small freight yards with four spurs leading to slant-sided steel and earthen hardened shelters to house the trains.

Two hi-cube boxcars were constructed by St Louis Refrigerator Car Company. They were modified at Westinghouse, receiving bogie trucks, distributing their  of weight over 8 axles. Low-slung beams were added to the underside to level the car against the track during launch.  roof panels were designed to fall off when the missile was erected. The Air Force sought US$2.16 billion in fiscal year 1991 to purchase the first seven MX trains.

The deployment plan called for the trains to be permanently based in shelters that would be constructed on Strategic Air Command bases throughout the United States, with the missile crews on continuous alert. Ten bases were in the running; Fairchild Air Force Base (Spokane, WA), Malmstrom Air Force Base (Great Falls, MT), Minot Air Force Base (Minot, ND), Grand Forks Air Force Base (Grand Forks, ND), Dyess Air Force Base (Abilene, TX), Whiteman Air Force Base, (Knob Noster, MO), Blytheville Air Force Base (Blytheville, AR), Little Rock Air Force Base (Little Rock, AR), Barksdale Air Force Base (Shreveport, LA), and Wurtsmith Air Force Base (Oscoda, MI). Upon the receipt of a signal indicating an increase in alert level, the trains would be "flushed", dispersing onto the American railroad network, thus making it difficult for an enemy to determine where the missiles were at any given time to target them.

Major contractors for the rail garrison system were Boeing Aerospace Corporation, Westinghouse Marine Division and Rockwell International Autonetics. The proposed main garrison for the weapons deployment system was to be F.E. Warren Air Force Base in Wyoming, with each selected garrison hosting up to four trains.

Testing and termination

After several years of development, the prototype Rail Garrison Car was delivered to the U.S. Air Force on October 4, 1990. After undergoing initial evaluation at Vandenberg Air Force Base, the car was then sent to the Transportation Test Center in Pueblo, Colorado for further testing on the Association of American Railroads' test track.

In 1991, with the end of the Cold War, the Peacekeeper rail garrison system was canceled. As a result, all operational Peacekeeper missiles produced were installed in former Minuteman silos. Following termination, the prototype rail garrison car was delivered to the National Museum of the United States Air Force at Wright-Patterson Air Force Base, Ohio, in 1994 for public display.

See also

 BZhRK Barguzin
 LGM-30 Minuteman
 Minuteman Mobility Test Train - preceding pilot scale development in the 1960s.
 Railway gun
 RT-23 Molodets - equivalent operational Soviet system.
 Transporter erector launcher - A road-mobile missile launcher.

 White Train

References
Notes

Citations

Further reading

External links

Missile launchers
Railway weapons
Rocket launch sites in the United States
Rolling stock of the United States
Abandoned military projects of the United States
Cold War military equipment of the United States
Nuclear warfare
Weapon fixtures